Joseph Léon de La Marthonie (Saint-Germain-du-Seudre, 27 March 1727 — Saintes, Charente-Maritime, 6 August 1789) was a French Navy officer. He served during the War of American Independence.

Biography 
La Marthonie was born to the family of Suzanne Galateau and Léon Raymond de La Marthonie de Gaignon. La Marthonie joined the Navy as a Garde-Marine on 28 November 1743.

In 1767, La Marthonie captained the 4-gun corvette Lunette.

In 1770,  La Marthonie captained 64-gun Bizarre, at Rochefort.

On 4 May 1779, La Marthonie was promoted to Brigadier des Armées navales. He was given command of the 64-gun Jason, based at Toulon. The year after, he took command of the 74-gun Pluton. He captained her at the Battle of Martinique on 17 April 1780.

Sources and references 
 Notes

Citations

References

External links
 
 

French Navy officers
French military personnel of the American Revolutionary War
1727 births
1789 deaths